Jim K. Benton (born October 31, 1960) is an American illustrator and writer. Licensed properties he has created include Dear Dumb Diary, Dog of Glee, Franny K. Stein, Just Jimmy, Just Plain Mean, Sweetypuss, The Misters, Meany Doodles, Vampy Doodles, Kissy Doodles, and the jOkObo project, but he is probably most known for his creation It's Happy Bunny.

Early life and education
Jim Benton was raised in Birmingham, Michigan, graduating from Seaholm High School in 1978. He studied fine arts at Western Michigan University.

Career
Benton began his career in a Shirt shop where he started designing his own characters on T-shirts. At the same time, he did illustrations and artwork for magazines and newspapers. People magazine named him "one of the most visible cartoonists in America."

Benton also created greeting cards and worked in the magazine and publishing industry. In 1998, his SpyDogs characters became an animated series, The Secret Files of the Spy Dogs, that aired on Fox Kids. Licensing his own creations brought them widespread attention on products, such as It's Happy Bunny, which he created in the mid-1990s but licensed in 2002.

Benton currently lives in Michigan, where he operates out of his own studio. He is married and is a father of two children.

Dear Dumb Diary
 #1: Let's Pretend This Never Happened (2004)
 #2: My Pants Are Haunted! (2004)
 #3: Am I The Princess Or The Frog? (2005)
 #4: Never Do Anything, Ever (2005)
 #5: Can Adults Become Human? (2006)
 #6: The Problem With Here is That It's Where I'm From (2007)
 #7: Never Underestimate Your Dumbness (2008)
 #8: It's Not My Fault I Know Everything (2009)
 #9: That's What Friends Aren't For (2010)
 #10: The Worst Things In Life Are Also Free (2010)
 #11: Okay, So Maybe I Do Have Superpowers (2011)
 #12: Me! (Just Like You, Only Better) (2011)

Dear Dumb Diary: Year Two
 #1: School. Hasn't This Gone on Long Enough? (2012)
 #2: The Super-Nice are Super-Annoying (2012)
 #3: Nobody's Perfect. I'm as Close as It Gets. (Jan. 2013)
 #4  What I Don't Know Might Hurt Me (Feb. 2014)
 #5  You can Bet on That (March 2014)
 #6  Live Each Day to the Dumbest (2015)

It's Happy Bunny
 Love Bites(2004)
 Life. Get One (2005)
 What's Your Sign? (2006)
 The Good,The Bad,The Bunny (2006)
 It's Happy Bunny Nice Enough Poster Book (2007)

Franny K. Stein
Lunch Walks Among Us (2003)
 Attack of the 50-Ft. Cupid (2004)
 The Invisible Fran (2004)
 The Fran That Time Forgot (2005)
 Frantastic Voyage (2005)
 The Fran With Four Brains (2006)
 The Frandidate (2008)
 Bad Hair Day (2019)
 Recipe for Disaster (2020)
 Mood Science (2021)

Awards
2004: Gryphon Award honor book, Center for Children's Books, University of Illinois at Urbana-Champaign (Lunch Walks Among Us)
2005: LIMA International Licensing Award, Best Art Brand License (It's Happy Bunny)
2006: Eleanor Cameron Award, Golden Duck Award Committee (The Fran That Time Forgot)
2006: LIMA International Licensing Award, Best Character Brand License – Soft Goods  (It's Happy Bunny)
2007: LIMA International Licensing Award, Best Character Brand License – Hard Goods  (It's Happy Bunny)
2007: Austin ADDY Awards (with Partnership for a Drug-Free America, Texas Alliance)
Silver award, Public Service Campaign
Bronze award, Public Service postcard
2009: Nomination National Cartoonists Society Reuben Award, Book Illustration: Cherise The Niece
2011: National Cartoonists Society Reuben Award, Greeting Cards: It's Happy Bunny
2014: National Parenting Publications Awards GOLD MEDAL: The End (Almost)
2015: Eisner Award Nominee: Dog Butts and Love. And Stuff Like That. And Cats.

References
.

External links
J.K. Benton Design Studios
Blackjack Inc.
J.K. Benton Gallery
Benton's Books
 

1960 births
Living people
American children's writers
American illustrators
Writers from Michigan
Western Michigan University alumni
People from Birmingham, Michigan
People from Bloomfield, Oakland County, Michigan